Suon-Tit (Suon Tiit) is a rural locality (a selo) in Momsky Rural Okrug of Momsky District in the Sakha Republic, Russia, located  from Khonuu, the administrative center of both the district and the rural okrug. Its population as of the 2010 Census was 131, down from 154 recorded during the 2002 Census.

References

Notes

Sources
Official website of the Sakha Republic. Registry of the Administrative-Territorial Divisions of the Sakha Republic. Momsky District. 

Rural localities in Momsky District